Aristillus is a prominent lunar impact crater that lies in the eastern Mare Imbrium. It was named after Greek astronomer Aristyllus. Directly to the south is the smaller crater Autolycus, while to the southwest is the large Archimedes. To the northeast are the craters Theaetetus and Cassini.

The rim of Aristillus has a wide, irregular outer rampart of ejecta that is relatively easy to discern against the smooth surface of the surrounding mare. The crater impact created a ray system that extends for a distance of over 600 kilometers. Due to its rays, Aristillus is mapped as part of the Copernican System.  The rim is generally circular in form, but possesses a slight hexagonal shape. The inner walls of the rim have a terraced surface, and descend to a relatively rough interior that has not been flooded with lava. In the middle of the crater is a set of three clustered peaks, which rise to a height of about 0.9 km.

In the northern outer ramparts of Aristillus is a ghost crater remnant. This is the protruding rim of an old crater that has been almost completely submerged by the lava flows of the surrounding Mare Imbrium. The southern end of the rim has been covered by the ejecta from Aristillus. Along the eastern inner wall and rim is an unusual narrow ribbon of dark material.

English progressive rock band Camel named the first song on their album Moonmadness after the crater. Science fiction author Travis J I Corcoran set much of his first novel, The Powers of the Earth, on and under Aristillus.

Satellite craters
By convention these features are identified on lunar maps by placing the letter on the side of the crater midpoint that is closest to Aristillus.

References

Sources

External links
 
 
 

Impact craters on the Moon
Mare Imbrium